Altai Airport  is a public airport serving Altai, which is the capital of the Govi-Altai province (aimag) in western Mongolia. It is capable of handling An-24 type aircraft, including Fokker 50, Dash 8 and ATR 42.

Airlines and destinations

See also 

 List of airports in Mongolia
 List of airlines of Mongolia

References

External links

Airports in Mongolia
Govi-Altai Province